The Saylor Academy, formerly known as the Saylor Foundation, is a non-profit organization headquartered in Washington, DC. It was established in 1999 by its sole trustee, Michael J. Saylor. Since 2008, the focus of the foundation has been its Free Education Initiative which has led to the creation of 241 courses representing 10 of the highest enrollment majors in the US.

The Saylor Academy assembles courses from openly available texts and resources. The foundation also funds the creation of new materials when needed, which is then openly licensed for use by other organizations and individuals. In March 2018 Edovo partnered with  Saylor Academy.

Courses
On its website, the foundation offers 317 free, college-level courses, which are selected as typical courses in high enrollment majors at traditional U.S. colleges. Content is accessible without needing to register or log into the website, however an account is required to gain access to final exams, and a free certificate of completion.

The foundation works with consultants to design the courses, typically university and college faculty members or subject experts. The consultant develops a blueprint for the course, then researches open educational resources (OER) to supply the course with lectures, texts, and other resources. If suitable texts and documents are not found, the foundation works with faculty to compile new materials which it releases to the OER community under a Creative Commons license. Each course is accompanied by an assessment.

Accreditation and credentialing
The Saylor Academy is accredited within the NCCRS. According to the company, they have experimented with digital badges through the Open Badge Infrastructure.

Through cooperation with other organizations, the Saylor Academy can offer degrees.

References

External links
 

Educational organizations based in the United States
Foundations based in Washington, D.C.
Educational publishing companies of the United States
Creative Commons-licensed books
American educational websites
Online nonprofit organizations
Open educational resources
Education companies established in 1999
Organizations established in 1999
1999 establishments in the United States